Dolores Vallecita (May 10, 1877 – January 13, 1925), also known as Dolly Vallecita Hill, was an American vaudeville entertainer, and circus animal trainer.

Biography 
Born on May 10, 1877, at Natchez, Mississippi, United States, Dolores Vallecita, a Spanish-born animal trainer, who had never handled wild animals prior to 1900. While she was raising Shetland ponies for business purpose, she came into contact with circus people. She gradually developed interest on wild animals, and started to train them.

She made her debut at Austin & Stone's Museum, Boston, in 1905, with a pair of pumas, a leopard and a lion. She later moved to Denver, and purchased five leopards. She had a number of successful appearances at Luna Park, Scranton, Pennsylvania. She trained her troupe of six Indian leopards to perform different tricks including rolling globes, see saw, electric wheel, forming a pyramid, and posing for pictures.

During 1907–1908, she toured the world, and performed in a number of major cities including London, Berlin, and Havana.

She married a New Yorker-based animal broker Arthur I. Hill.

She died in Bay City on January 13, 1925, following a mishap that occurred when one of her leopards swiped at her, and "accidentally tore out her throat".

References

1877 births
1925 deaths
Animal trainers